340ml (pronounced: three forty mil) is an African musical group who originate from Mozambique, Maputo, but are now based in Johannesburg, South Africa. They have therefore jokingly been described by some as being "Jozambican". The band incorporates many different elements into their music including dub, jazz, ska, Afro-jazz and reggae. It is therefore very difficult to attach the band to any specific music genre, as their style is rather unusual. The music that 340ml produces is often described as having a very relaxed African-feel to it, and also strongly incorporates elements of Latin music, and to a lesser extent, Marrabenta. Their music has also been described by Jean Barker (a music critic on ) as "sounding better than a cold beer opening on a hot day."

History

The four band members arrived in Johannesburg in the mid-1990s in order to pursue academic careers. Paulo Jorge Chibanga had intentions on becoming an architect, Rui Soeiro studied a Bachelor of Commerce, Pedro Pinto's career choices lay in Industrial Psychology and Tiago Correia-Paulo pursued a career in Economics. Paulo branched out into a different area of design, with his Dubstars clothing label which is reportedly becoming very popular within Johannesburg. Rui started working on releasing music compilations called Dubvaults through the band's label 340ml Music. Pedro ventured into jewelry design and other crafts. Tiago worked as a designer and illustrator for many years and now is more involved in film and video directing and producing.

Despite all these academic qualifications, the band has always focused on producing music, firstly in Maputo and then when Rui and Paulo joined a band which was led by their art teacher at St. Martin's School in Southern Johannesburg. The name of the band was Panic Orange. In the late 1990s Panic Orange earned a semi-final spot in the annual Emerging Sounds competition, but the then rock band had begun to turn towards the genre of Ska, and dropped its name, as well as its rock-playing member in the middle of the contest.
 

All four band members had known each other while growing up in Maputo. Tiago and Pedro had played together in a Rage Against the Machine-inspired rap metal cover band as teenagers during the 1990s.

340ml, after many false starts, derived its final name from a measurement on a beverage can when it formalised in 2000. Their debut album, Moving, was co-produced by the Jazzworx production team and incorporated parts of, amongst others, dub, reggae, jazz, Brazilian music and rock.

Sorry for the Delay
Four years after releasing their debut album, Moving, 340ml released a second album entitled Sorry for the Delay. The name of their second album is a result of the many delays the band experienced while producing it, mainly due to the fact that they had been victims of Johannesburg crime four times, twice having their cars filled with equipment stolen, and twice having their studios broken into and stripped down.

Discography
Moving (2004)
Sorry for the Delay (2008)

Notes

External links

References

Dub musical groups
South African reggae musical groups
South African ska groups
Mozambican reggae musical groups
Mozambican ska groups
Musical groups established in 2000
Culture of Johannesburg